Wynton Kelly! is an album by jazz pianist Wynton Kelly released on the Vee-Jay label featuring performances by Kelly with Paul Chambers or Sam Jones and Jimmy Cobb recorded in 1961. Additional performances from these sessions were released as Someday My Prince Will Come.

Reception
The Allmusic review by Jim Todd awarded the album 2½ stars and states "a fine example of Kelly relaxed and swinging. Working a similar niche to some of the piano trio work of Red Garland and Ahmad Jamal — two pianists with their own associations with Miles Davis — Kelly takes a selection of well-known standards and energizes them with tasteful, sophisticated, snappy performances, blending in a group of original tunes along the way".

Critic Ira Gitler writing in the January 4, 1962 issue of DownBeat awarded the album four stars. He called it "A throughly enjoyable, professional piano recital. Kelly has all the equipment, and he knows what to do with it."

Track listing
All compositions by Wynton Kelly except as indicated
 "Come Rain or Come Shine" (Harold Arlen, Johnny Mercer) - 5:53  
 "Make the Man Love Me" (Dorothy Fields, Arthur Schwartz) - 3:39  
 "Autumn Leaves" (Joseph Kosma, Johnny Mercer, Jacques Prévert) - 6:11  
 "The Surrey With the Fringe on Top" (Oscar Hammerstein II, Richard Rodgers) - 3:48  
 "Joe's Avenue" aka "Scotch and Water" (Joe Zawinul) - 2:51  
 "Sassy" - 5:11  
 "Love, I've Found You" (Danny Small) - 2:36  
 "Gone with the Wind" (Herbert Magidson, Allie Wrubel) - 4:13  
Recorded at Bell Sound Studio A in New York City on July 20 (tracks 3 & 5) & 21 (tracks 1, 2, 4 & 6-8), 1961

Personnel
Wynton Kelly - piano
Paul Chambers (tracks 3–5, 7 & 8), Sam Jones (tracks 1, 2 & 6)  - bass
Jimmy Cobb - drums

References

1961 albums
Vee-Jay Records albums
Wynton Kelly albums
albums produced by Orrin Keepnews